The Polish Sejm crisis, 16 December 2016—12 January 2017, was a period of political stalemate in Poland's national legislature, resulting from an attempt to limit freedom of the press at the Sejm buildings in Warsaw, Poland.  The attempt to restrict press access to Sejm members and deliberations led to protests by opposition-party Sejm members, and by citizens of Poland's major cities, including Warsaw.

Background 
On 16 December 2016 during the session of Polish parliament, the Sejm, opposition deputy Michał Szczerba (from Civic Platform party) came to the stage with the card which read "#WolneMediawSejmie" (hashtag "Free press in Sejm") and attempted to fix it to the rostrum. After warnings, Marshal of the Sejm, Marek Kuchciński, excluded him from debate for disturbance and announced a break.  As planned before, opposition deputies started the occupation of the podium and the plenary hall. Subsequently, the MPs of ruling party, Law and Justice, moved the meeting to the Hall of Columns, where the deputies voted on, among other topics, the budget for 2017. A number of MPs from the opposition who still occupied the plenary hall did not participate in the voting, and the vote count was done by show of hands.

Protests 

First groups of protesters appeared in front of the parliament before locking the plenary hall in the protest against restrictions for press in Sejm buildings. It included dozens of journalist from mainstream Polish media, including from Gazeta Wyborcza, Newsweek Polska and TVN24. The protest was supported by many people associated with the opposition, including Deputy Marshal of the Sejm Małgorzata Kidawa-Błońska, Civic Platform leader Grzegorz Schetyna, Modern leader Ryszard Petru, Committee for the Defence of Democracy leader Mateusz Kijowski, civic movement Citizens of Poland.

On 16 and 17 December protests were held in many of big cities in Poland including Wrocław, Kraków, Gdańsk, Poznań, Szczecin, Katowice, Olsztyn, Białystok, Lublin, Kielce and Płock.

References 

2016 in Poland
2016 protests
Protests in Poland
Protests in the European Union
December 2016 events in Europe
Polish